Christelijke Voetbalvereniging de Jodan Boys is a football club from Gouda, Netherlands. The club was founded in 1934. It is currently playing in the Vierde Divisie.

References

External links
 Official site

Football clubs in the Netherlands
Association football clubs established in 1934
Football clubs in South Holland
1934 establishments in the Netherlands
Sport in Gouda, South Holland